Francis Frederick Reh (January 9, 1911 – November 14, 1994) was an American prelate of the Roman Catholic church. He served as bishop of the Diocese of Charleston in South Carolina from 1962 to 1964.

Reh previously served as rector of the Pontifical North American College in Rome from 1964 to 1968, and as bishop of the Diocese of Saginaw in Michigan from 1968 to 1980.

Biography

Early life 
One of two children, Francis Reh was born in Bronx, New York, to Gustave A. and Elizabeth (née Hartnagel) Reh. His father worked as a truant officer for the New York City Board of Education.

Francis Reh attended the parochial school of Immaculate Conception Parish in the Bronx, then entered Cathedral College in Queens, New York, at age 13. After graduating from Cathedral College in 1930, Reh went to St Joseph's Seminary in Yonkers, New York, for two years.  He then travelled to Rome to reside at the Pontifical North American College while attending the Pontifical Gregorian University.

Priesthood 
Reh was ordained to the priesthood by Cardinal Francesco Selvaggiani in Rome at the North American College chapel for the Archdiocese of New York on December 8, 1935. He earned a Licentiate of Sacred Theology in 1936 and a Doctor of Canon Law degree summa cum laude in 1939 in Rome from the Pontifical Gregorian University.

After returning to New York City in 1939, Reh served as assistant chancellor of the archdiocese and associate pastor at St. Patrick's Cathedral Parish for two years. From 1941 to 1951, he was professor of moral theology and canon law at St Joseph's Seminary. He also served as defender of the bond on the archdiocesan tribunal. He became vice-chancellor in 1951.

In 1954, Reh was named a papal chamberlain by Pope Pius XII and vice-rector at North American College in Rome. He returned to St. Joseph's Seminary in New York in 1958 as its rector. That same year, he accompanied Cardinal Francis Spellman to Rome for the papal conclave that elected Pope John XXIII.

Bishop of Charleston 
On June 6, 1962, Reh was appointed the ninth bishop of the Diocese of Charleston by John XXIII. He received his episcopal consecration on June 29, 1962, from Cardinal Spellman, with Archbishop John Maguire and Bishop John Fearns serving as co-consecrators. At his consecration, he wore the same vestments worn by Cardinal Spellman and Pope Pius XII at their own consecrations. Between 1962 and 1965, Reh attended all four sessions of the Second Vatican Council in Rome.

Rector of North American College 
On September 5, 1964, Reh was named to succeed Bishop Martin O'Connor as rector of the North American College. He was appointed titular bishop of Macriana in Mauretania on the same date.

Bishop of Saginaw 
On December 11, 1968, Reh was appointed bishop of the Saginaw diocese by Pope Paul VI. As bishop, Reh instituted a formation program for lay people that was the first in the United States.  He also supervised renovations to the Cathedral of Mary of the Assumption in Saginaw.

Retirement 
On April 29, 1980, Pope John Paul II accepted Reh's resignation as bishop of Saginaw. He was succeeded by Reverend Kenneth Untener. Francis Reh died in Saginaw on October 14, 1994 at age 83.

Notes

1911 births
1994 deaths
American people of German descent
Saint Joseph's Seminary (Dunwoodie) alumni
Participants in the Second Vatican Council
Pontifical North American College rectors
People from the Bronx
20th-century Roman Catholic bishops in the United States
Roman Catholic bishops of Saginaw
Roman Catholic bishops of Charleston
Catholics from New York (state)